Rosemary Casals and Billie Jean King were the defending champions, but lost in the third round to Jane Bartkowicz and Julie Heldman.

Margaret Court and Judy Tegart defeated Patti Hogan and Peggy Michel in the final, 9–7, 6–2 to win the ladies' doubles tennis title at the 1969 Wimbledon Championships.

Seeds

  Margaret Court /  Judy Tegart (champions)
  Rosie Casals /  Billie Jean King  (third round)
  Françoise Dürr /  Ann Jones (third round)
  Lesley Turner /  Virginia Wade (first round)

Draw

Finals

Top half

Section 1

Section 2

Bottom half

Section 3

Section 4

References

External links

1969 Wimbledon Championships – Women's draws and results at the International Tennis Federation

Women's Doubles
Wimbledon Championship by year – Women's doubles
Wimbledon Championships
Wimbledon Championships